John Heslop Audland (5 October 1852 – 4 October 1931) was a Welsh cleric and cricketer.

Life
The son of John Audland of Ackenthwaite, he  was educated at Magdalen College School. He matriculated at Magdalen College, Oxford, in 1871, graduating B.A. in 1876, M.A. in 1878. He became a Church of England priest and was vicar of Dinton, Wiltshire, 1886–1923. Audland married Joanna Elizabeth Wilson, daughter of Edward Wilson of Ballycrana, county Cork.

Audland played one first-class match for Oxford University Cricket Club in 1875.

See also
 List of Oxford University Cricket Club players

References

External links
 
 Stained Glass Window to John Heslop Audland

1852 births
1931 deaths
Welsh cricketers
Oxford University cricketers
People from Monmouthshire
Cricketers from Monmouthshire
Alumni of Magdalen College, Oxford
19th-century Welsh Anglican priests